USS Scandinavia (SP-3363) was a patrol vessel in commission in the United States Navy from 1918 to 1919, seeing service in World War I. After her U.S. Navy service, she was in commission in the United States Coast and Geodetic Survey as the survey launch USC&GS Scandinavia from 1919.

Construction
Scandinavia was built as a civilian motorboat of the same name by the G. T. Taylor Marine Railway at Norfolk, Virginia, in 1916.

United States Navy service

The U.S. Navy acquired Scandinavia from Bie and Schiott of Baltimore, Maryland, on either 3 or 5 October 1918 (sources disagree) for World War I service in the section patrol. The Navy commissioned her on 5 October 1918 as USS Scandinavia (SP-3363).

The Navy assigned Scandinavia to duty with the Naval Overseas Transportation Service district supervisor at Baltimore for service as a dispatch boat and pilot boat. On 21 May 1919, she was decommissioned, stricken from the Navy list, and transferred to the United States Coast and Geodetic Survey.

United States Coast and Geodetic Survey service

The U.S. Coast and Geodetic Survey commissioned the vessel as USC&GS Scandinavia and placed her in service as a survey launch. Photographs of Scandinavia during her Coast and Geodetic Survey career show her performing wire-drag operations in support of hydrographic survey work in the Territory of Alaska in 1920 and operating in Southeast Alaska in 1927.

References

External links
Dictionary of American Naval Fighting Ships: Scandinavia
NavSource Online: Section Patrol Craft Photo Archive Scandinavia (SP 3363)
NOAA Photo Library: Coast and Geodetic Survey Launch SCANDINAVIA conducting wiredrag operations in Alaskan waters.
NOAA Photo Library: The launch SCANDINAVIA. Described as a fine launch but with quarters for only 3 men.

Patrol vessels of the United States Navy
World War I patrol vessels of the United States
Ships of the United States Coast and Geodetic Survey
Ships transferred from the United States Navy to the United States Coast and Geodetic Survey
Survey ships of the United States
Ships built in Norfolk, Virginia
1916 ships